Some Strange Country is the fourth studio album by progressive bluegrass group Crooked Still.

Track list
 Sometimes in this Country (Trad. arr. Crooked Still) 4:00
 The Golden Vanity (Trad. arr. Crooked Still) 4:16
 Distress (Anne Steele/Trad. arr. Crooked Still) 3:05
 Henry Lee (Trad. arr. Crooked Still) 4:05
 Half of What we Know (Aoife Maria O'Donovan) 4:02
 I'm Troubled (Trad. arr. Crooked Still) 2:45
 Locust in the Willow (Brittany Haas) 3:49
 Turning Away (Greg Liszt) 1:40
 Calvary (Trad. arr. Crooked Still) 4:03
 Cold Mountains (Trad. arr. Crooked Still) 3:13
 You Were Gone	(Aoife Maria O'Donovan/Brittany Haas/Tristan Clarridge) 4:23
 You Got the Silver (Mick Jagger/Keith Richards) 3:50

Personnel 
 Aoife O'Donovan - vocals
 Gregory Liszt - banjo
 Tristan Clarridge - violoncello
 Corey DiMario - upright bass
 Brittany Haas - 5-string fiddle, vocals

References

External links
Official website

2010 albums
Crooked Still albums